Kasumigaura may refer to:

Places:

 Kasumigaura, Ibaraki, a city in Ibaraki prefecture, Japan
 Lake Kasumigaura, a lake in Honshu, Japan
 Kasumigaura Station, a railway station in the city of Kasumigaura

See also